Márton Szivós (born 19 August 1981) is a Hungarian water polo player. He is part of the national team since 2003 and competed at the 2012 and 2016 Olympics. He is a son of István Szívós, Jr. and a grandson of István Szívós, both of whom won Olympic gold medals in water polo.

Szivós served in Hungarian Army. In 2012 he received a Silver Cross of the Order of Merit of the Republic of Hungary. In April 2014 he suffered chest pains during a local match. He was taken to a hospital, where he was diagnosed as having suffered a heart attack and underwent surgery.

Honours

National
 World Championships:  Gold medal - 2013;  Silver medal - 2005, 2007
 European Championship:  Silver medal - 2006, 2014;  Bronze medal - 2012
 FINA World League:  Gold medal - 2004;  Silver medal - 2005, 2013, 2014
 FINA World Cup:  Silver medal - 2006
 Universiade: (Gold medal - 2003)
 Junior World Championships: (Bronze medal - 2001)
 Youth European Championship: (Gold medal - 1997; Bronze medal - 1999)

Club
Bp. Honvéd (Domino-BHSE)
 Hungarian Championship (5x): 2000–01, 2001–02, 2002–03, 2003–04, 2004–05
 LEN Euroleague (1x): 2003–04
 LEN Super Cup (1x): 2004

Pro Recco
  Italian Championship (1x): 2005–06
  Italian Cup (1x): 2005–06
 LEN Euroleague runners-up: 2005–06

Bp. Honvéd (Domino-Honvéd, Grupama Honvéd)
 Hungarian Cup (2x): 2006, 2010

Szeged (A-HÍD Szeged, Diapolo Szeged)
 Hungarian Cup (2x): 2012, 2013

Eger (ZF-Eger)
 Hungarian Cup (1x): 2015

Awards
LEN Champions League Final Four MVP: 2005–06 with Pro Recco
 Faragó-díj (2000)
 Golden Waterpolo wandering Award (2009)
 National Defence awards (2012)

Orders
   Silver Cross of the Cross of Merit of Hungary (2012)

See also
 List of world champions in men's water polo
 List of World Aquatics Championships medalists in water polo

References

External links

 

Hungarian male water polo players
1981 births
Living people
Olympic water polo players of Hungary
Water polo players at the 2012 Summer Olympics
Water polo players at the 2016 Summer Olympics
World Aquatics Championships medalists in water polo
Universiade medalists in water polo
Universiade gold medalists for Hungary
Hungarian water polo coaches
Water polo players from Budapest
20th-century Hungarian people
21st-century Hungarian people